The Communist Party of South Ossetia is a communist party in South Ossetia. The party was founded in 1993. As of 2004, the party claimed a membership of 1,500. The party seeks recognition of the Republic of South Ossetia, which is considered by most countries as part of Georgia

CPSO is led by Stanislav Kochiev, who is also chairman and speaker of the South Ossetian Parliament. Yulia Tekhova is the deputy secretary of the party.

The party is affiliated to the Union of Communist Parties-Communist Party of the Soviet Union.

History 
In the March 1994 election, the party got 19 seats out of 36. Overall, the party obtained 47.2% of the popular vote

In the May 1999 election, the party gained only 12 deputies and 47.7% of the party list vote. This high result of the Communists, according to Ossetian experts, was influenced by the support of State Duma Deputy Anatoly Chekhoev, who arrived in Tskhinvali shortly before the elections.

In the South Ossetian presidential elections of November–December 2001, Kochiev collected 24% of the votes in the first round of the elections on November 18 and 40% in the second round on December 6, arriving second after Eduard Kokoity.

In the South Ossetian parliamentary elections of May 2004, the CPSO won 24.7% of the popular vote and 4 out of 34 seats.

In the 2006 presidential election, the party supported the incumbent Eduard Kokoity. However, the party declared that it didn't support all policies of the government.

General Secretary

Election results

Parliament

References

External links

Political parties established in 1993
Communist parties in Georgia (country)
Political parties in South Ossetia
1993 establishments in Georgia (country)